The Practice of the 'One Country, Two Systems' Policy in the Hong Kong Special Administrative Region is a white paper issued by the Information Office of the State Council of the People's Republic of China (PRC) on the practice of the "one country, two systems" policy in the Hong Kong Special Administrative Region (HKSAR) on 10 June 2014 in the midst of public debate on the 2014 Hong Kong electoral reform and preparations for the Occupy Central movement by the pan-democracy camp.

Peking University legal theorist Jiang Shigong has been cited by Apple Daily as an author of the report.

Content
The white paper provided a historical review over the design and implementation of One Country, Two Systems (OCTS). While the White Paper itself has no binding legal authority, it is regarded a significant statement of the Central Authorities on the framework of the OCTS policy.

No Residual Powers
The white paper is the first official policy document that the Central Authorities have released to provide response to the issue of residual powers. It stated that the scope of Hong Kong’s high degree of autonomy is not inherent, but solely determined by the Central Authorities’ delegation of power. Thus, the White Paper concluded that there is no residual power for the HKSAR. Any power the Central Authorities did not explicitly authorize to the Hong Kong Special Administrative Region through the Basic Law is retained by the Central Authorities.

The white paper asserts that:

Comprehensive Jurisdiction
The white paper reasserts the "comprehensive jurisdiction" of Central Authorities over all of China, including the Hong Kong Special Administrative Region. The Paper provides no further explanation to the term. A speech made in 2017 by Zhang Dejiang, then-Chairman of the Standing Committee of the National People's Congress, provided that the overall jurisdiction includes powers in eight aspects:
 to appoint the CE and principal authorities of the HKSAR government;
 to receive the appointment of CFA judges and the Chief Judge of the High Court; 
 to manage diplomatic affairs related to the HKSAR; 
 to build the People's Liberation Army Hong Kong Garrison for defense duties; 
 to exercise the power of interpreting the Basic Law; 
 to exercise the power to make decisions on major issues;
 to exercise the power of approving and recording HKSAR legislations enacted; and
 to decide on implementations of national laws on the HKSAR.

Patriots administering Hong Kong
The white paper stresses that loving the country is the basic principle for Hong Kong's administrators, including:
 the chief executive;
 principal officials;
 members of the Executive Council;
 members of the Legislative Council; and
 judges of the courts at different levels and other judicial personnel. 

The white paper further states the responsibilities for administrators of Hong Kong:

Foreign interference
The Central Authorities have also stated its opinion on foreign interference over the Hong Kong Special Administrative Region:

Reception
The white paper ignited a firestorm of criticism from various sectors in Hong Kong who worried that the Communist leadership was reneging on its pledges to abide by the “one country, two systems” policy that allows for a democratic, autonomous Hong Kong under Beijing’s rule.

References

External links
 Full Text: The Practice of the "One Country, Two Systems" Policy in the Hong Kong Special Administrative Region

2014 in China
2014 in Hong Kong
White papers
2014 documents